Winkelman v. Parma City School District, 550 U.S. 516 (2007), is a civil suit under the Individuals with Disabilities Education Act decided by the Supreme Court of the United States. Justice Kennedy held for the seven-justice majority that parents may file suit under IDEA pro se.  Justice Kennedy declined to reach the question whether parents may represent the interests of their children pro se, instead concluding that IDEA created a set of independently enforceable rights in parents.

See also
 List of United States Supreme Court cases
 Lists of United States Supreme Court cases by volume
 List of United States Supreme Court cases by the Roberts Court

References

External links
 
Winkleman v. Parma City School District, 550 U.S. 516 (2007), URL:  https://supreme.justia.com/cases/federal/us/550/516/
United States Supreme Court cases
United States education case law
2007 in United States case law
2007 in education
United States lawsuits
United States disability case law
Education in Cuyahoga County, Ohio
United States Supreme Court cases of the Roberts Court
Parma, Ohio